AŞTİ is an underground station and the western terminus of the Ankaray line of the Ankara Metro in Çankaya. It is located on the east side of Mevlana Boulevard, across from the Ankara Intercity Bus Terminal (AŞTİ). AŞTİ station consists of two side platforms and opened on 30 August 1996, together with the Ankaray line. Connection to the bus terminal is available via a passageway underneath Mevlana Boulevard.

Tracks continue south of the station to the Söğütözü Maintenance Facility and further to Söğütözü station, which was completed in 2014 but without Ankaray service.

References

External links
EGO Ankara - Official website
Ankaray - Official website

Railway stations opened in 1996
Ankara metro stations
1996 establishments in Turkey
Çankaya, Ankara